Sakura (fl. 13th–14th century) was a mansa of the Mali Empire who reigned during the late 13th century, known primarily from an account given by Ibn Khaldun in his Kitāb al-ʻIbar.  Sakura was not a member of the ruling Keita dynasty, and may have been formerly enslaved. He usurped the throne following a period of political instability and led Mali to considerable territorial expansion. During his reign, trade between the Mali Empire and the rest of the Muslim world increased. He was killed in the early 1300s while returning from the hajj and the Keita dynasty was restored to power.

Biography

Sakura is commonly stated to have been a former slave of the royal court, but it is not clear if he was literally enslaved. Ibn Khaldun refers to him by the term mawlā, which can be translated as "client", and may imply that he was formerly enslaved but was freed by the Keitas. In oral tradition, he is called jonni, meaning "little slave". It is possible that Sakura was a member of the tontajon taniworo, the sixteen clans of freemen who had the right to bear a quiver. Despite being freemen, the tontajon taniworo are metaphorically referred to as slaves.

According to oral tradition, Sakura had a daughter, Sogolon Nyuman.

Reign

During the late 13th century, the leadership of the Mali Empire involved ongoing palace intrigues, with a power struggle between the gbara or Grand Council and the donson ton or hunter guilds. The historian Nehemia Levtzion speculated that Sakura may have been involved in a previous coup, in which Mansa Khalifa had been overthrown and replaced by Sunjata's grandson or nephew Abu Bakr. Eventually, Sakura seized the throne himself. The French colonial administrator and ethnographer Maurice Delafosse estimated his accession to have occurred in 1285.

Sakura was evidently able to stabilize his control of the Mali Empire, as he proceeded to launch a series of military campaigns which expanded the borders of the Mali Empire considerably. According to Ibn Khaldun, in his reign Malian rule extended west to the ocean and east to Takrur, by which Ibn Khaldun meant a land east of Gao and west of Kanem, not Takrur along the Senegal River. Trade between the Mali Empire and the rest of the Muslim world also began to flourish.

Ibn Khaldun credits Sakura with the conquest of Gao, but subsequently gives a conflicting account that Gao was conquered during the reign of Mansa Musa. The Tarikh al-Sudan agrees with the second account in crediting the conquest of Gao to Musa. It is possible that Sakura had indeed conquered Gao, but that ʿAlī Kulun, founder of the Sunni dynasty, liberated it only for Musa to reassert control over Gao decades later. It is also possible that Mali's control of Gao varied over time, with Mansa Uli, Sakura, and Musa able to secure control of it but control lapsing under less-powerful rulers.

According to Ibn Khaldun, Sakura performed the hajj. He was the first mansa to do so since Uli. Sakura may have sought to strengthen ties with the rest of the Muslim world and display Mali's power during his hajj. Oral tradition does not record Sakura as having performed the hajj.

Sakura's death most likely occurred in the early 1300s. In Ibn Khaldun's account, Sakura was killed while returning from the hajj in the town of Tajura, 12 miles east of Tripoli,, whereas oral tradition says that Kon Mamadi (Qu), a grandson of Sunjata, killed him himself with the help of Sakura's daughter. After Sakura's death, Qu succeeded him as mansa.

Legacy

Ibn Khaldun regarded Sakura as a mighty ruler and describes his reign in greater detail than his predecessors. The 20th-century historian Djibril Tamsir Niane regarded Sakura as having saved the Mali Empire from political crisis. By contrast, there are few recorded oral histories that mention him, and what little mention he receives in them focuses on his status as an usurper. Niane suggested that this may be a deliberate exclusion on the part of oral historians, and it is possible that the few accounts of Sakura recorded in oral tradition are later additions based on the account given by Ibn Khaldun. The memory of Sakura may have been partially incorporated into the hero Fakoli of oral tradition, a great general who supported Sunjata.

The 21st-century historian Michael A. Gomez has expressed skepticism of Sakura's reign, suggesting that aspects of Musa's reign were attributed to Sakura to allow for indirect criticism of Musa.

Footnotes

References

Primary sources

 .

Other sources

 .
 

13th-century births
1300 deaths
Mansas of Mali
People of the Mali Empire
Malian slaves
13th-century murdered monarchs
13th-century monarchs in Africa
Keita family
Medieval slaves